Austin Mahone Takeover is a web documentary series about singer Austin Mahone, broadcast on November 2, 2012. It was directed by Ryan Bell.

History
The series shows the life and career of singer Austin Mahone with their first steps in the music world. The episodes show Mahone in awards, events, performances and moments with fans. The web series had two seasons with 60 episodes released on YouTube.

Guest appearances and cameos
 Sean Kingston
 Enrique Iglesias
 Bridgit Mendler
 Akon
 Fifth Harmony
 Selena Gomez
 Psy
 Kelly Rowland
 T-Pain
 Flo Rida

Episodes

Season 1 (2012-13)

Season 2 (2013)

References

External links

2012 web series debuts
2013 web series endings
2010s YouTube series